Graswijk is a hamlet in the Netherlands and is part of the Assen municipality in Drenthe. 

Graswijk is a statistical entity, but the postal authorities have placed it under Assen. It was first mentioned in the 1850s, and means neighbourhood near grass.

References 

Populated places in Drenthe
Assen